Walter Duncan McIndoe (March 30, 1819August 22, 1872) was a Scottish American immigrant, lumber industrialist, and politician.  A Republican, he represented Wisconsin for two terms in the United States House of Representatives (from 1863 to 1867).

Biography

Born in Dumbartonshire, Scotland, McIndoe immigrated to the United States in 1834.  He engaged in business in New York, Charleston, and St. Louis, finally settling in the Wisconsin Territory in 1845 where he became involved in the lumber business.

He served as a member of the Wisconsin State Assembly in 1850, 1854, and 1855.  In 1850 as a member of the Assembly he introduced a bill changing the name of his home community from "Big Bull Falls" to Wausau and creating Marathon County.  Initially a Whig, in 1854 he became a member of the newly formed Republican Party.

He was a candidate for the Republican nomination for Governor of Wisconsin at the 1857 Republican state convention, contending with Edward Dwight Holton, with both candidates losing to the eventual nominee and governor, Alexander Randall.  During the American Civil War he was provost marshal of Wisconsin.

McIndoe was first elected to Congress in the December 1862 special election to replace Congressman Luther Hanchett, who died three weeks after the 1862 general election.  Hanchett was the incumbent in Wisconsin's 2nd congressional district and, in the 1862 general election, had been elected to Wisconsin's newly-created 6th congressional district.  McIndoe's election allowed him to replace Hanchett for the last months of the 37th Congress and also for the full term of the 38th Congress.  He was subsequently re-elected in 1864 to the 39th Congress, ultimately serving from January 26, 1863, until March 3, 1867.

During the Thirty-ninth Congress, he served as chairman of the House Committee on Revolutionary Pensions. In 1866, McIndoe declined candidacy for renomination, instead resuming his interests in the lumber business. He died in Wausau, Wisconsin, on August 22, 1872, and was interred at Pine Grove Cemetery.

Electoral history

U.S. House of Representatives (1862, 1864)

| colspan="6" style="text-align:center;background-color: #e9e9e9;"| Special Election, December 30, 1862

| colspan="6" style="text-align:center;background-color: #e9e9e9;"| General Election, November 8, 1864

References

External links
 
 

1819 births
1872 deaths
Politicians from Wausau, Wisconsin
Businesspeople from Wisconsin
Members of the Wisconsin State Assembly
Wisconsin Whigs
Republican Party members of the United States House of Representatives from Wisconsin
19th-century American politicians
Scottish emigrants to the United States
19th-century American businesspeople